Lafat is a commune in the Creuse department in the Nouvelle-Aquitaine region in central France.

Geography
The small rivers Sédelle and Brézentine, tributaries of the Creuse, flow through the commune.

Population

Sights
 The church, dating from the fifteenth century.
 The thirteenth-century chapel.
 A watermill.

See also
Communes of the Creuse department

References

Communes of Creuse